Shoilmari River is a small river of Bangladesh located in the south-west of Khulna District. According to the Bangladesh Water Development Board it is the number 89 river of the south-western region.

Location
This river is located in the Batiaghata Upazila of Khulna District.

References

Rivers of Bangladesh
Khulna District
Rivers of Khulna Division